Beardfish was a Swedish progressive rock band formed in 2001. Their style resembles progressive rock bands from the 1970s, such as Yes and Genesis. The band's most prolific line-up consisted of founding members vocalist/keyboardist Rikard Sjöblom and guitarist David Zackrisson, along with longtime drummer Magnus Östgren and bassist Robert Hansen; who joined the band in 2001 and 2002 respectively; this line-up existed from 2003 (following the departure of keyboardist Stefan Aronsson) until the band's dissolution in 2016.

History
The initial lineup of Beardfish consisted of frontman Rikard Sjöblom, guitarist David Zackrisson, bassist Gabriel Olsson, and drummer Petter Diamant. Before the end of 2001, Diamant had been replaced by Magnus Östgren, and early in 2002 the band's lineup was augmented by keyboardist Stefan Aronsson. Later that year, Olsson was replaced by Robert Hansen, and it was this lineup that recorded the band's debut album, Från En Plats Du Ej Kan Se, in 2003. Following the release of the album, Aronsson left the band, leaving Beardfish with the four-man lineup which existed for the rest of the duration of the band's existence.

Following the release of the band's second album, The Sane Day, in 2006, the band were signed by InsideOut Music. They have remained on this label ever since, releasing six more albums to date, the latest of which is 2015's +4626-COMFORTZONE.

In 2008, Beardfish toured with fellow progressive rock band The Tangent. The following year they were scheduled to tour North America during the summer as part of Progressive Nation, a tour organized by Dream Theater's then-drummer Mike Portnoy; however, they were forced to withdraw from this event after InsideOut lost funding because its distributor, SPV, declared bankruptcy.

In September 2012, Beardfish were the opening act for all European dates of the band Flying Colors, and in May 2013, were one of the opening acts (along with Sound of Contact) for all European dates of the band Spock's Beard.  The band followed this up by touring with Sound of Contact in support of Spock's Beard during 2013. In 2014 the band commenced work on their eighth studio album, with Sjöblom also joining the band Big Big Train in the capacity of touring guitarist. In October it was announced that Sjöblom would remain with Big Big Train in an official capacity. The following month Beardfish announced the completion of their eighth studio album, entitled *+4626-COMFORTZONE, scheduled for release in January 2015. For the tour dates commencing in early 2015 the band extended their touring line-up with the addition of keyboardist Martin Borgh.

In July 2016, the band announced they had broken up.

Personnel

Members

Classic line-up
Rikard Sjöblom - vocals, keyboards, guitars (2001–2016)
David Zackrisson - guitars (2001–2016)
Magnus Östgren - drums (2001–2016)
Robert Hansen - bass (2002–2016)

Early members
Gabriel Olsson - bass (2001-2002)
Petter Diamant - drums (2001)
Stefan Aronsson - keyboards, guitars, flute (2002-2003)

Touring musicians
Martin Borgh - keyboards (2015)

Lineups

Timeline

Discography 
Från en plats du ej kan se... (2003)
The Sane Day (2005)
Sleeping in Traffic: Part One (2007)
Sleeping in Traffic: Part Two (2008)
Destined Solitaire (2009)
Mammoth (2011)
The Void (2012)
+4626-COMFORTZONE (2015)

References

External links 
2010 interview with Rikard Sjöblom on Prog Sphere

Swedish progressive rock groups
Musical groups established in 2001
2001 establishments in Sweden
Inside Out Music artists